VU, Vu or vu may refer to:

Arts and entertainment

Music
 Sandra Vu, American musician, singer, and songwriter
 The Velvet Underground, American rock band
 VU (album), an album released by the Velvet Underground
 Volume unit as displayed on a VU meter

Other media
 Vu (film), an Indian film
 Vu (magazine), a French publication that existed from 1928 to 1940
 Tom Vu, poker player and former infomercial star

Businesses and organizations

Political organizations
 Patriotic Union (Vaterländische Union), a political party in Liechtenstein
 Venstres Ungdom, the youth wing of the Danish liberal party Venstre
 Volksunie, a defunct Flemish political party

Universities 

 Victoria University (disambiguation), various unrelated universities

United States 

 Valparaiso University in Valparaiso, Indiana
 Vanderbilt University in Nashville, Tennessee
 Vanguard University in Costa Mesa, California
 Villanova University in Villanova, Pennsylvania
 Vincennes University in Vincennes, Indiana

Elsewhere 

 Vedanta University in Orissa, India
 Vilnius University in Vilnius, Lithuania
 Virtual University of Pakistan in Lahore, Punjab, Pakistan
 Vrije Universiteit Amsterdam in Amsterdam, Netherlands
 Vrije Universiteit Brussel in Brussels, Belgium

Other businesses and organizations
 Air Ivoire, IATA airline designator
 Vietravel Airlines, IATA airline designator
 Vivendi Universal, now Vivendi SA, a French company active in media and communications
 Agence Vu, a photography agency, publisher and gallery based in Paris
 Vu Televisions, a television brand and an LED TV and display manufacturer based in Mumbai

Science and technology
 νμ, in physics, the symbol for a muon neutrino
 .vu, Vanuatu's country code top-level domain
 Vu+, satellite set-top box equipment
 LG Vu, a cell phone produced by LG

 Vulnerable species, on the IUCN Red List
 VU meter, a representation of audio signal strength

Other uses
 Vanuatu (country code VU)
 Voices United, the official hymn book of the United Church of Canada
 Vũ, Vietnamese surname